The Tour Series is an annual series of cycling criterium races held in the United Kingdom since 2009. It is televised by ITV4 in the UK. The competition emphasises team effort with individual wins deemed less important.

The races are held over 1 hour of racing plus 5 laps. The team standings for each round are calculated by adding together the positions of the top three riders of each team (5 riders start for each team) and the team with the lowest score wins, and get 10 points for the overall championship. Each team gets 1 point less than the one in front of them, so second gets 9, third gets 8, and so on. In addition, there is the sprint competition. There are three sprints every race, and the top five riders are awarded points based on place: 1st, 5; 2nd, 4; 3rd, 3; 4th, 2 and 5th, 1. There is a competition each round, as well as an overall competition for the whole series.

2009 Series

The first series had 10 rounds across England. The first ever round was held in Milton Keynes, and the final round was held in Southend. Halfords BikeHut had the strongest team, made up largely of powerful sprinters who were suited to the criteriums. Few of the circuits were hilly, which was seen to aid Halfords.

Rounds

2010 Series

The series was now sponsored by Halfords, who no longer had their own team. There were again 10 rounds, including the round at Durham with its steep cobbled climb. This time Motorpoint, led by veteran Malcolm Elliott came out as victors, with Malcolm himself winning in Durham.

Rounds

2011 Series

The series was cut to only 8 rounds. The early stages were dominated by  who won all of the first four rounds, both individually and as a team. This run was broken by Team Endura in the next two rounds, firstly winning the individual race, and then in the 6th round in Oldham, winning individually and overall.

Rounds

2012 Series

There were 11 rounds in the 2012 series. The early stages were dominated by  who won all of the first four rounds as a team.

Rounds

2013 Series

There were 12 rounds in the 2013 series.

Rounds

2014 Series

There were 10 rounds (and 12 races) in the 2014 series.

Rounds

2015 Series

There were 10 rounds (and 12 races) in the 2015 series.

Rounds

2016 Series

There were 10 rounds (and 11 races) in the 2016 series.

Rounds

2017 Series

There were 10 rounds (and 11 races) in the 2017 series, condensed into the month of May and including Saturday night races for the first time.

Rounds

2018 Series

The 2018 series was announced in April, with a scheduled eight rounds and 10 races taking place from 10 to 31 May.

Rounds

2019 Series

The 2019 series was announced in April, with a scheduled seven rounds taking place from 9 to 25 May.

Rounds

2021 Series

Following the cancellation of the 2020 event, the 2021 series was announced in June, with a scheduled three rounds taking place from 8 to 12 August.

Rounds

2022 Series

The 2022 series venues were announced in February and March, initially with six rounds until a Grand Final in Manchester was added to the schedule.

The series was sponsored by Sportsbreaks.com.

Rounds

2023
Event organisers SweetSpot announced in February 2023 that the Tour Series would not take place in 2023, citing pressures on local authority funding and wider economic challenges as the reasons. They stated that they would work on plans for the Series to return in 2024.

Notes

References

External links

Cycle races in the United Kingdom
Cycle racing series